Appleby GO Station is a railway station and bus station in the GO Transit network located in the 5000 block of Fairview Street in  Burlington, Ontario in Canada near Appleby Line.  It is a stop on the Lakeshore West line train service.

This station primarily serves residential areas in the eastern part of Burlington with train services on weekdays and weekends. There are connecting Burlington Transit local bus services.

Renovations began in the fall of 2014, incorporating repairs to the parking lots, relocation of the south drop-off area, the addition of energy efficient lighting and reconstruction of the south bus loop.

Burlington Transit connecting service
1 Plains-Fairview
4 Central
10 New-Maple
11 Sutton-Alton
25 Walkers 
80 Harvester
81 North Service (Peak Service only)

Oakville Transit connecting service
14/14A Lakeshore West

References

External links

GO Transit railway stations
Railway stations in Burlington, Ontario
Railway stations in Canada opened in 1988
1988 establishments in Ontario